Leh is a city in Ladakh, Indian Kashmir.

Leh or LEH may refer to:

Places

Asia
 Leh district, Ladakh, India
 Leh Palace, Leh

Europe 
 Léh, a village in Northern Hungary
 Lady Eleanor Holles School, South West London, England
 Lea Hall railway station, West Midlands, England (CRS code: LEH)
 Le Havre – Octeville Airport, Normandy, France (IATA code: LEH)

Elsewhere 
 Lower Erebus Hut, on Ross Island off Antarctica
 Leh's, a closed store in Allentown, Pennsylvania, United States

People 
 Dennis Leh (born 1946), American politician
 Leh Keen (born 1983), American racecar driver

Other uses 
 Lehman Brothers, an insolvent American investment bank (NYSE symbol: LEH)
 Lenje language, spoken in Zambia (ISO 639-3: leh)

See also

 Leah (disambiguation)
 Lee (disambiguation)
 Le (disambiguation)
 LEHS (disambiguation)